Boneh Khalkhal (also Romanized as Boneh Khalkhāl and Beneh Khalkhāl; also known as Bina-Khakhal, Bina Khalkhāl, and Boneh Khalkāl) is a village in Sanjabad-e Jonubi Rural District, Firuz District, Kowsar County, Ardabil Province, Iran. At the 2006 census, its population was 40, in 8 families.

References 

Towns and villages in Kowsar County